NetIQ is a product line within the CyberRes line of business at Micro Focus, which includes solutions focused on cybersecurity, including ArcSight, Fortify, Voltage, and NetIQ. 

NetIQ was previously based in Houston, Texas, with products that provide identity and access management, security and data center management. Its flagship offerings are
NetIQ Identity Manager and NetIQ Access Manager. Other past software titles include AppManager, Secure Configuration Manager, and Sentinel.

Micro Focus International has owned NetIQ since 2014, when MFI acquired The Attachmate Group, which acquired NetIQ in 2006, six years after the latter acquired Mission Critical Software.

History
NetIQ was founded by Ching-fa Hwang, Her-daw Che, Hon Wong, Ken Prayoon Cheng and Tom Kemp in September 1995; ; AppManager was introduced 1996. Their February 2000 merger with Mission Critical Software widened the company's focus to include systems management as well as performance.

In 2001, NetIQ acquired Webtrends, whose software "monitors corporate Internet traffic." — which they sold in 2005.

In 2006, NetIQ was acquired by AttachmateWRQ, After that company acquired Novell in 2011, it changed its name to The Attachmate Group. NetIQ added identity and security products as well as data center and virtualization to their offerings. It was the Attachmate acquisition that led to the alignment of NetIQ products into three categories: 
 identity and access management, 
 security management and 
 data center management.

In 2014, The Attachmate Group was merged into Micro Focus International.

Products and services
 NetIQ Access Manager a Web access management product that provides single sign-on for web applications. 
 NetIQ Identity Manager NetIQ's implementation of Identity Management software. It utilizes XML-based configuration files to determine the product's implemented functions.

Privilege Access Management 
 Change Guardian
 Privileged Account Manager

See also

References

External links

Further reading
 
 

 
1995 establishments in California
2000 software
2006 mergers and acquisitions
2006 software
Companies based in San Jose, California
Computer security software
Federated identity
Identity management systems
Information technology companies of the United States
Information technology management
Micro Focus International
Access Manager
Identity Manager
Access Manager
Identity Manager
Software companies established in 1995